Marszewo  (formerly ) is a village in the administrative district of Gmina Goleniów, within Goleniów County, West Pomeranian Voivodeship, in north-western Poland. It is located in the historic region of Pomerania.

The village has an approximate population of 200.

References

Villages in Goleniów County